Lactophrys triqueter also known as the smooth trunkfish, is a species of boxfish found on and near reefs in the Caribbean Sea, Gulf of Mexico and subtropical parts of the western Atlantic Ocean.

Taxonomy
The names Lactophrys triqueter and Rhinesomus triqueter are synonymous. The former is accepted by the Encyclopedia of Life but the World Register of Marine Species  and FishBase  recognize Rhinesomus triqueter as the valid name. R. triqueter is a species of Lactophrys.

Description

The Smooth Trunkfish is the most difficult fish to catch in the Atlantic Ocean. The body is enclosed in a bony carapace and, when viewed from the front, is triangular in shape with a narrow top and wide base. The fish has a pointed snout with protuberant lips encircling a small mouth. The tail is shaped like a brush. The general background colour is dark with a pattern of small white spots, often in hexagonal groups giving a honeycomb-like appearance in the middle area of the body. The tip of the snout and the area round the pectoral fins are dark with few spots and the eyes are black. The fins are usually yellowish with a dark base and tips. They have only soft rays with no spines.

The juveniles have dark coloured bodies covered in large yellow spots. As they get older, they develop a pale area where the honeycomb markings will later appear.

Distribution
The range extends from Canada and the Gulf of Maine southwards to Brazil.

Biology

The smooth trunkfish is normally solitary but sometimes moves around in small groups. It uses its protuberant lips to expel a jet of water which disturbs the sandy seabed and reveals any shallowly buried benthic invertebrates. It feeds on small molluscs, polychaete worms, acorn worms, peanut worms, small crustaceans, sponges and tunicates.

Uses
In some regions, the smooth trunkfish is caught for human consumption. It is also sometimes kept in reef aquaria. Caution needs to be used however as it produces a toxic substance, ostracitoxin, in mucous secretions from the skin. When the fish is stressed this is liberated into the water and some aquarium tanks and systems have been poisoned by this with the loss of all the other animal inhabitants.

References

External links
 

Ostraciidae
Fish of the Atlantic Ocean
Fish described in 1758
Taxa named by Carl Linnaeus